The Roman Catholic Diocese of Atakpamé is a diocese located in the city of Dapaong in the Ecclesiastical province of Lomé in Togo.

History
 March 1, 1960: Established as Apostolic Prefecture of Dapango from the Diocese of Sokodé
 July 6, 1965: Promoted as Diocese of Dapango 
 December 3, 1990: Renamed as Diocese of Dapaong

Special churches
The Cathedral is Cathédrale Saint Charles Lwanga in Dapaong.

Leadership
 Prefect Apostolic of Dapango (Roman rite) 
 Fr. Barthélemy-Pierre-Joseph Hanrion, O.F.M. (1960.03.29 – 1965.07.06 see below)
 Bishop of Dapango (Roman rite) 
 Bishop Barthélemy-Pierre-Joseph Hanrion, O.F.M. (see above 1965.07.06 – 1984.09.18)
 Bishops of Dapaong (Roman rite)
 Bishop Jacques Tukumbé Nyimbusède Anyilunda (1990.12.03 - 2016.11.15)
 Bishop Dominique Banlène Guigbile (since 2016.11.15)

See also
Roman Catholicism in Togo

Sources
 GCatholic.org
 Catholic Hierarchy

Dapaong
Dapaong
Christian organizations established in 1960
Roman Catholic dioceses and prelatures established in the 20th century
1960 establishments in Togo